Perityle is a genus of flowering plants in the daisy family. They are known generally as rock daisies.

Perityle is a variable genus, with its members sharing few characteristics. They include small herbs to spreading shrubs and most bear yellow or white daisylike flower heads. The fruit is generally a flat seed with thickened margins which may or may not have a pappus or scales. Plants of this genus are native to North and South America.

 Species

References

External links
 
 Jepson Manual Treatment
 USDA Plants Profile

Perityleae
Asteraceae genera
Taxa named by George Bentham